DSU may refer to:

Organisations
  (Social Democratic Youth of Denmark)
 Directorate of special units, the police tactical unit of the Belgian Federal Police
 German Social Union (East Germany), from 1990
 Dansk Skytte Union, a Danish association for sport shooting
 Demobilised Soldiers' Union, a political party in Estonia
Direct Source Unit, a sub-division of UK police forces dedicated to handling covert assets.

Education
 Dagestan State University, a public university in Makhachkala, Republic of Dagestan
 Dakota State University, a public university in Madison, South Dakota
 Dayananda Sagar University, a state private research university in Bengaluru, Karnataka
 Delaware State University, a public historically black university in Dover, Delaware
 Delta State University, a public university in Cleveland, Mississippi
 DeSales University, a private Catholic university in Center Valley, Pennsylvania
 DHA Suffa University, a private university run by the Pakistan Army
 Dickinson State University, a public university in Dickinson, North Dakota
 Distance State University, public university in the Republic of Costa Rica
 Dixie State University, recently renamed (2022) Utah Tech University, a public university in St. George, Utah
 Dong Seoul University, a private technical college in Seongnam, South Korea

Student Union
 Dalhousie Student Union, representative of students at Dalhousie University
 Durham Students' Union, the students' union of Durham University
 Dutch Student Union, a national students' union of the Netherlands

Technology
 Data service unit, a WAN equivalent of a network interface card
 Decorate-sort-undecorate, a computer science programming idiom
 Disjoint-set data structure, a data structure used to track disjoint sets
 Distress signal unit, used by firefighters
 Dynamic software updating, upgrading programs while they are running

Other uses
 DSU (album), by Alex G (2014)
 Dispute Settlement Understanding, in the World Trade Organization